In the United States, full documentation loan refers to a loan where all income and assets are documented. It is typically referred to as a "full doc" loan in the mortgage industry and is a common type of loan used for financing a home purchase.

Required documentation 

Below is a list of some of the documents that are commonly required when applying for a full documentation loan.

Income verification 
 Proof of Earnings:
 W-2 form
 Recent pay stub
 Tax returns for the past two years
 Proof of Earnings (if self-employed):
 Profit and loss statements
 Tax returns for current year and previous two years
 Any additional income; for example:
 Social Security
 Overtime bonus
 Commission
 Passive income (interest income)
 Veteran's Benefits

Asset verification 
 Address of one's bank branch
 Bank account numbers
 Checking and savings account statements for the previous 2–3 months
 Savings bonds, stocks or investments and their approximate market values
 Copies of titles to any motor vehicles that are paid in full

Debt information 
 Credit card bills for the past few billing periods
 Other consumer debt; for example:
 Car Loans
 Furniture Loans
 Student Loans
 Other personal and cosigned installment loans with creditor addresses and phone numbers
 Evidence of mortgage and/or rental payments
 Copies of alimony or child support

Information regarding desired purchase 
 Copy of the Ratified Purchase Contract
 Proof one is committed to the purchase
 Cancelled deposit check

References 

Mortgage industry of the United States
Loans